The Queen of Hearts is a 2009 film directed by Valérie Donzelli. It was presented at the Locarno International Film Festival for the Filmmakers of the Present Competition.

Cast 
 Valérie Donzelli : Adèle
 Jérémie Elkaïm : Mathieu/Pierre/Paul/Jacques
 Béatrice de Staël : Rachel
 Laure Marsac : la Femme au téléphone
 Lucía Sánchez : la Voisine
 Vanessa Seward : Gladys
 Gilles Marchand : le Vigile
 Dominik Moll : le Jogger
 Benoit Carré : le Fou
 Serge Bozon : le Médecin

External links
 

2009 films
Films directed by Valérie Donzelli
French comedy-drama films
2009 comedy-drama films
2009 directorial debut films
2000s French-language films
2000s French films